Blankenburg was a Verwaltungsgemeinschaft ("collective municipality") in the district of Harz, in Saxony-Anhalt, Germany. The seat of the Verwaltungsgemeinschaft was in Blankenburg am Harz. It was disbanded on 1 January 2010.

The Verwaltungsgemeinschaft Blankenburg consisted of the following municipalities:

 Blankenburg am Harz
 Cattenstedt 
 Heimburg 
 Hüttenrode 
 Timmenrode 
 Wienrode

References

Former Verwaltungsgemeinschaften in Saxony-Anhalt